Tsend (genitive form: Tsendiin) is a Mongolian name, signifying:

 Tsendiin Damdinsüren (1908–1986), Mongolian author
 Luvsansharavyn Tsend (born 1940), Mongolian Olympic speed-skater
 Tsendiin Nyamdorj (born 1956), chairman of the Mongolian parliament
 Tsendiin Damdin (1957–2018), olympic judo silver medalist of 1957
 Tsend-Ayuushiin Ochirbat (born 1974), Mongolian Olympic judoka
 Tsendiin Mönkh-Orgil, the foreign minister of Mongolia